Eirini Kokkinariou (born 14 February 1981 in Athens, Greece) is a female Greek long-distance runner. She competes mostly in the 3000 metres steeplechase event. In 2012, she was banned from the sport for four years after doping.

She finished ninth at the 2006 World Cup and took the third place at the 2007 Superleague. She competed at the 2006 European Championships, the 2007 World Championships, the 2008 Olympic Games, the 2009 World Championships and the 2011 World Championships without reaching the final.

Personal bests

Achievements

References

1981 births
Living people
Athletes from Athens
Greek female long-distance runners
Greek female steeplechase runners
Olympic athletes of Greece
Athletes (track and field) at the 2008 Summer Olympics
World Athletics Championships athletes for Greece
Panathinaikos Athletics
Doping cases in athletics
Greek sportspeople in doping cases